Saddle Butte Township is a township in Golden Valley County, North Dakota, United States. Its population was 25 as of the 2010 census, down from 27 in 2000.

The township of Saddle Butte is located on the western border of the county and the state. It borders the following other townships in Golden Valley County:
Elk Creek—northeast corner
Delhi—east
Beach—south
It is bordered to the north by Elmwood Unorganized Territory, formerly Elmwood Township.

References

Townships in Golden Valley County, North Dakota
Townships in North Dakota